Jan Ingstrup-Mikkelsen (born 25 February 1944) is a former Danish cyclist. He competed in the 1000m time trial and the team pursuit at the 1964 Summer Olympics. Husband of Jette Andersen.

References

1944 births
Living people
Danish male cyclists
Olympic cyclists of Denmark
Cyclists at the 1964 Summer Olympics
People from Helsingør
Sportspeople from the Capital Region of Denmark